Epilobium leptophyllum is a species of flowering plant in the evening primrose family known by the common names bog willowherb and linear-leaved willowherb. It is native to much of eastern and northern North America, where it grows in moist areas, such as bogs. It is a perennial herb growing up to a meter tall and spreading with tiny stolons. The leaves are generally linear in shape but may be wider to nearly oval, and reach up to about 7.5 centimeters. The inflorescence is a raceme of small flowers with white to pink petals a few millimeters long. The fruit is a hairy, elongated capsule up to 8 centimeters in length.

External links
Jepson Manual Treatment

leptophyllum
Taxa named by Constantine Samuel Rafinesque